Jamie Walker may refer to:

 Jamie Walker (baseball) (born 1971),  American baseball pitcher
 Jamie Walker (bowls) (born 1991), England bowls player
 Jamie Walker (footballer) (born 1993), Scottish footballer
 Jamie Walker (minister), Church of Scotland minister
 Jamie Walker (Hollyoaks), Hollyoaks character

See also
James Walker (disambiguation)